Monte Pecoraro is a mountain in the Serre Calabresi, in southern Calabria, southern Italy.

It is located in the territory of Mongiana, in the province of Vibo Valentia.

Mountains of Calabria
Mountains of the Apennines
One-thousanders of Italy